Georgy Nikitin (born 26 April 1973) is a Russian rower. He competed in the men's quadruple sculls event at the 1996 Summer Olympics.

References

1973 births
Living people
Russian male rowers
Olympic rowers of Russia
Rowers at the 1996 Summer Olympics
Place of birth missing (living people)